SATB is an initialism that describes the scoring of compositions for choirs, and also choirs (or consorts) of instruments. The initials are for the voice types: S for soprano, A for alto, T for tenor and B for bass.

Choral music 
Four-part harmony using soprano, alto, tenor and bass is a common scoring in classical music, including chorales and most Bach cantatas.

The letters of the abbreviation are also used by publishers to describe different scorings for soloists and choirs other than four-part harmony. For example, the listing "STB solos, SATB choir", of Bach's Wachet auf, ruft uns die Stimme, BWV 140, indicates that a performance needs three soloists: soprano, tenor and bass, and a four-part choir. "SATB/SATB" is used when a double choir is required, as in Penderecki's Polish Requiem. or SSATB, with divided sopranos, which is a typical scoring in English church music. A listing for Bach's Mass in B minor includes the maximum of SSATB soloists and SSAATTBB eight-part choir, and also indicates that it contains choral movements for SATB, SSATB, SSATBB and SATB/SATB, as well as arias for individual soloists, and duets for SS, ST and SA.

Other letters of abbreviation, however with less consistency, have been used by publishers, such as "Tr" for treble (boy soprano), "Mz" for mezzo-soprano, "Ba", "Bar" or "Bari" for baritone, "C" for both canto (the highest part) and contralto, and "Ct" for countertenor. "SATB div." indicates that part are sometimes divided (divisi) during a piece, often sharing the same staff.

Notation
When soprano and alto are notated in one staff, all stems for soprano go up, and all for alto go down. Similarly, when tenor and bass are notated in one staff, the upper voice is marked by stems up, and both voices written in bass clef, while tenor is usually written in treble clef marked an octave down if it has its own staff.

The rules of voice leading apply to SATB notations.

Instrumental music 
In a broader sense, choirs of instruments can also be described by the abbreviation SATB, often for members of the same family of instruments, such as consorts of recorders, viola da gamba, saxophones and trombones. The abbreviations are also a common way to describe which "voices" perform in instrumental compositions such as fugues, including Bach's The Art of Fugue and The Musical Offering, written without indication of specific instruments.

Notes

References

Further reading
 

Acronyms
Choral music
Voicing (music)